Atreya or Aatreya is a Hindu Brahmin patronymic surname and gotra from the ancient sage Atreya, a descendant of Prajapati Atri.

Notable people
Notable people with the surname includes

Bhikhan Lal Atreya, Indian writer and scholar
Rasana Atreya, Indian English language author
Vishnu Raj Atreya, Nepalese writer known as Laato Sathi

Indian surnames
Nepali-language surnames
Khas surnames